The MTV Video Music Award for Best Stage Performance in a Video was first awarded at the first annual MTV Video Music Awards in 1984. The last of this award was given out in 1989.

Recipients

See also 
 MTV Europe Music Award for Best Live Act
 MTV Europe Music Award for Best World Stage Performance

References

MTV Video Music Awards
Awards established in 1984
Awards disestablished in 1989